Bear Hill is a mountain located in the Catskill Mountains of New York south of Ellenville. Losees Hill is located east, and Mount Meenahga is located northeast of Bear Hill.

References

Mountains of Ulster County, New York
Mountains of New York (state)